Yellow Tail Records is an independent record label based in Seattle, Washington. Founded in the early 1990s, by Andrew Ratshin and Hilary Field, it releases a variety of folk, acoustic, and classical music. In addition, the label has released the two award-winning children's music recordings, "Siente: Night Songs from Around the World" and "Cantilena: Night Songs from Around the World," from classical guitarist Hilary Field and singer Patrice O'Neill, as well as the two "Just One Angel" holiday compilation discs.

Artists

 Geísa Dutra
 Electric Bonsai Band
 Hilary Field
 Gwen Franz (Field & Franz)
 Scott Katz
 Christine Lavin
 Mel Cooleys
 Miles and Karina
 Patrice O'Neill
 Matt Price
 Bill Radke
 Uncle Bonsai

See also
 List of record labels

External links
 Yellow Tail Records

American independent record labels
Folk record labels
Classical music record labels